Lajos "Lou" Nagy (born May 9, 1960) is a Canadian retired soccer forward who played professionally in the North American Soccer League and  Major Indoor Soccer League.

Career 
In 1978, Nagy graduated from Cardinal Newman Secondary School. He attended Laurentian University, where he was a 1979 First Team All-Canadian soccer player. In 1979, he signed with the Toronto Blizzard of the North American Soccer League. He never cracked the first team before moving to the Atlanta Chiefs for the 1980 NASL season. He also played in the National Soccer League in 1979 with Hamilton Italo-Canadians. He saw time in a handful of games before moving indoors with the Denver Avalanche of the Major Indoor Soccer League in the fall of 1980. 

The Avalanche traded him to the Baltimore Blast during the season. The Blast released him in the spring of 1985. In 1986, he played for the Hamilton Steelers as they won the Canadian National Championship. HE played again in 1988. In 1995, he returned to the Canadian National Soccer League to play with Hamilton White Eagles. 

In 2013, he was inducted into the Hamilton Soccer Hall of Fame.

International career 
In 1979, Nagy was a member of the Canada men's national under-20 soccer team which went 1-2-0 at the 1979 FIFA World Youth Championship.  He played all three Canadian games in the tournament, scoring one goal.

Managerial career 
In 1995, Nagy managed in the Canadian National Soccer League with Hamilton White Eagles, where he served as a player-coach. He served as a head coach for Cardinal Newman Cardinals, and with Hamilton Greek Olympics. He is currently the technical director for Ancaster Soccer Club.

References

External links
 NASL/MISL stats
 

Living people
1960 births
Soccer players from Hamilton, Ontario
Atlanta Chiefs players
Baltimore Blast (1980–1992) players
Canadian soccer coaches
Canadian soccer players
Canadian expatriate soccer players
Canadian expatriate sportspeople in the United States
Denver Avalanche players
Hamilton Steelers (1981–1992) players
Major Indoor Soccer League (1978–1992) players
Canadian people of Hungarian descent
North American Soccer League (1968–1984) players
Canada men's youth international soccer players
Association football forwards
Canadian National Soccer League players
Canadian National Soccer League coaches